Zhu Yudong (born May 16, 1974) is a Chinese director, screenwriter and lecturer. Zhu is employed as a director at the Science & Education of Programming Center of China Central Television (CCTV). He is mainly responsible for the filming of documentaries in the field of humanities and cultures.

Early life

Zhu Yudong was born in Wuxi, Jiangsu Province in China. He started to study painting at high school. In the year of 1992, he was enrolled to the Department of Fine Arts at Nanjing University of the Arts, majoring in the disciplines of Fine Arts. He received a bachelor's degree in the Fine Arts four years later. In the year of 2000, Zhu was accepted by the Departments of Directing at Beijing Film Academy and started his Master's Program in drama directing. He graduated with a master's degree in Directing in the year of 2003. Later that year, he got allocated to the Science & Education of Programming Center of China Central Television (CCTV) and he has been working there ever since. Between the year of 2003 and 2007, Zhu also took up the position as a part-time lecturer to the Central Academy of Drama, where he was mostly involved with the teaching of the disciplines of directing .

Career

Ever since the early stage of his employment at CCTV, Zhu has been directing numerous documentaries, such as The Legend of Falcon Hunting (2004), The Boatman of River Gui (2007) to name but a few. Most of his film works are published and issued by China International Television Corporation.

In the year of 2008, Zhu directed and filmed the episode of the Temple of Heaven of the CCTV epic documentary series The World Cultural Heritage in China. Seven years in total were spent upon the producing and filming of the series which, in the form of a high-definition documentary for the very first time, systemically and concentrically displays 33 heritage sites in China that have been inserted into the World Heritage Site List. The categories of the heritage sites mentioned inside the series range from natural heritages, cultural heritages, folk narrations as well as intangible cultural heritages.

That same year, Zhu, as a director who constantly replays historical events in the present era, directed the filming of a 20-episode cultural feature TV series The Waters of China. This series, which is produced by CCTV and takes the typically renowned waters-related historical and contemporary events as the starting point, comprehensively showcases the relationship between China's civilization and waters, and explains the unique role waters play in the historical development of China as well as the influence a series of water-control projects have cast upon China's historical process through many a vivid stories. The series has been very highly spoken of by CCTV and received excellent reviews.

In 2009, Zhu played a significant role as a literature planner in producing the feature film for China Pavilion at Shanghai Expo 2010. He was majorly responsible for the designing of the filming schemes.

In 2012, Zhu wrote and directed the theatre movie The Island's Dream. It tells a story of the residents at the East Sea Isle, who, inspired by the "Hai Xia Spirit", strive hard as a team to complete the project of the connection of five isles during the critical period of China's economic development. The film also succeeds in promoting and propelling the Hai Xia Spirit by combining the elements of story-telling with artistry.

Zhu has successfully gained a great deal of filming & directing experience through the various short clips he has created and directed, including diverse commercial & advertising clips, music videos, the corporate videos for the promotion of cities and for the applications of World Heritage Site List, etc.

In the meanwhile, Zhu has been awarded with many national and international screenplay prizes for the screenplays he has written, such as The Other (2002), Da Vinci's Boy (2006) and some others.

Achievements

In 2002, Zhu Yudong won the Best Screenplay at the Annual Taiwan Government Information Office of Executive Yuan Excellent Screenplay Award for his screenplay The Other.

In 2006, Zhu Yudong's screenplay Da Vinci's Boy won the Prize of the Best Screenplay of Governmental Support at the Annual Xia Yan Cup State Administration of Radio, Film, and Television Screenplay Award.

In 2011, Zhu was appointed as one of the special guests for the Chinese Cinema Forum, which is the most important activity at the event of the 20th Annual Golden Rooster and Hundred Flowers Film Festival.

Zhu Yudong's first novel The Other has just been published in its English translation by the American Publisher Boulevard Books.

In 2016, Zhu Yudong won the Prize of the Best New Concept Screenwriting at the San Francisco International New Concept Film Festival for his screenplay Rescue as a co-writer

External links

http://movie.douban.com/celebrity/1327351/

1974 births
Living people
Film directors from Jiangsu
Writers from Wuxi
Screenwriters from Jiangsu
People's Republic of China writers